Patrice Mahoulikponto (born 17 March 1958) is a Beninese sprinter. He competed in the men's 4 × 100 metres relay at the 1988 Summer Olympics.

References

1958 births
Living people
Athletes (track and field) at the 1988 Summer Olympics
Beninese male sprinters
Olympic athletes of Benin
Place of birth missing (living people)